Craig Mackinlay  (born 7 October 1966) is a Conservative Party politician and businessman. Since May 2015, he has been the Member of Parliament (MP) for South Thanet.

Initially a member of the UK Independence Party (UKIP), Mackinlay served as deputy leader of UKIP from 1997 to 2000 and as acting leader of UKIP in 1997, before joining the Conservative Party in 2005.

Early life
Of Scottish heritage, Mackinlay was born on 7 October 1966 in Chatham and raised in Kent. After attending Rainham Mark Grammar School, he went up to the University of Birmingham, where he read zoology and comparative physiology. After graduating with the degree of BSc, he qualified as a chartered accountant (FCA) and as a chartered tax adviser (CTA) and is now partner in a Kent firm.

Political background
Mackinlay first became engaged in politics after observing the impact of Britain's membership of the European Exchange Rate Mechanism on clients and friends who were going bankrupt as a result of soaring interest rates. After hearing Alan Sked, a professor at the London School of Economics, speak on a BBC politics programme, he was persuaded to stand at the 1992 general election as an independent in support of the Anti-Federalist League, receiving 248 votes in Gillingham.

UKIP
When the Anti-Federalist League evolved into the UK Independence Party (UKIP), Mackinlay was appointed its founding treasurer and Vice-Chairman. He stood again in Gillingham at the 1997 general election, receiving 590 votes.

In July 1997, Sked resigned as UKIP leader, nominating Mackinlay as his successor. Mackinlay decided that the only way to keep the party going was to rework its constitution and hold a leadership election. Mackinlay stood in the election against Michael Holmes and Gerald Roberts. Holmes, with the backing of Nigel Farage, easily won and appointed Mackinlay as his deputy.

After the European Parliament election in 1999, Holmes dismissed Mackinlay and Party Secretary Tony Scholefield at a National Executive Committee (NEC) meeting, which prompted an immediate vote of no confidence in Holmes, who agreed to resign the following month.  After extensive wrangling, Jeffrey Titford was elected as the new party leader; Mackinlay stepped down as deputy, but remained on its NEC.

Mackinlay remained active in UKIP, standing in Totnes at the 2001 general election, at which he received 6.1%  of the vote, then back again in Gillingham in 2005, where he polled 2.6%. He also stood unsuccessfully in the 1994, 1999 and 2004 European elections.

Conservative Party
In July 2005, Mackinlay defected from UKIP to the Conservative Party. He was elected as a Conservative councillor on Medway Council in 2007 and re-elected in May 2011 with an increased majority.

In 2010, he fell out with Kent Police over Special Constable David Craggs, who was advised that there would be no conflict with him standing for election to Medway Council but, after being elected as a councillor, was informed that he could not hold both roles. In May 2011, Mackinlay was appointed a member of Kent Police Authority.

In June 2012, Mackinlay was selected as the Conservative candidate for the office of Kent Police and Crime Commissioner. In the November 2012 county-wide poll, he was defeated by the former Kent Police Authority chair Ann Barnes; Barnes: 114,137, Mackinlay: 60,248, on a turnout of just under 16%.

In 2015, he was elected as Member of Parliament for South Thanet at the general election, where he stood against UKIP leader Nigel Farage and comedian Al Murray, among others. Conservative Laura Sandys had represented the constituency in the House of Commons.

In October 2017 he said "unemployed young people from Glasgow should get on their bikes and work with gorgeous EU women on farms in the south of England after Brexit." Labour MSP James Kelly responded that the comments were "abhorrent and offensive", while Jenny Gilruth MSP said that the comments were "sexist and patronising".

In June 2018 it was reported that Mackinlay had been found to have twice breached parliament's rules due to a potential financial interest, according to a decision by its standards watchdog. The MP had used his position to press for the reopening of an airport from which his company had planned to run low-cost flights. Mackinlay responded that he no longer had plans for running flights from Manston Airport and that there "was no suggestion he benefited financially from raising the matter in the Commons."

In the House of Commons, he sat on the Committee on Exiting the European Union. He has previously sat on the Work and Pensions Select Committee and European Scrutiny Committee.

Following an interim report on the connections between colonialism and properties now in the care of the National Trust, including links with historic slavery, Mackinlay was among the signatories of a letter in November 2020 to The Telegraph from the "Common Sense Group" of Conservative Parliamentarians. The letter accused the National Trust of being "coloured by cultural Marxist dogma, colloquially known as the 'woke agenda'".

Mackinlay leads the Net Zero Scrutiny Group, a group created in 2021 of about 20 Conservative MPs who argue against the Westminster consensus to reduce greenhouse gas emissions to net zero by 2050 regardless of the economic cost. They have argued for fracking in the UK to be resumed and cast doubt on plans to phase-out of fossil fuel vehicles.

Electoral spending criminal investigation following the 2015 general election
In 2016–17, the 2015 general election party spending investigation revealed that the Conservative Party had spent many thousands of pounds centrally on campaign buses to transport activists, and hotel accommodation for the activists, who went to campaign in marginal constituencies, including South Thanet. The expenditure on the buses was declared by the Conservative Party on its national declaration of "Campaign Spending", but in some cases the hotel accommodation was not declared at all as election spending when it should have been. In addition, there was controversy about whether the expenditure, both on the buses and the accommodation, should have been declared on the declarations of expenditure for the constituency made by each candidate's election agent. Kent Police began an investigation into the spending returns of Mackinlay following the Channel 4 report.

In a court case on 1 June 2016, brought by Mackinlay and his election agent Nathan Gray, District Judge Barron granted more time for investigation saying "In this case, the allegations are far-reaching and the consequences of a conviction would be of a local and national significance with the potential for election results being declared void."

On 14 March 2017, it was reported that Mackinlay had been interviewed under caution by officers investigating the allegations. The day after, Channel 4 News published leaked emails, alleging that Theresa May's Political Secretary Stephen Parkinson, and Chris Brannigan, Director of Government Relations at the Cabinet Office, also took a key role in Mackinlay's campaign. On 18 April 2017, Kent police passed Mackinlay's file to the Crown Prosecution Service (CPS) to be considered for prosecution. The CPS decided on 2 June 2017 that it was in the public interest to authorise charges under the Representation of the People Act 1983 against three people: Mackinlay, his agent Nathan Gray, and a party activist, Marion Little. Appearing at Westminster Magistrates' Court on 4 July 2017, the three pleaded not guilty and were released on unconditional bail pending an appearance at Southwark Crown Court on 1 August 2017.

Later in August 2017, a trial date of 14 May 2018 was set for Mackinlay on charges relating to his 2015 general election expenses, alongside Little and Gray. The trial eventually started on 15 October 2018. Gray was acquitted in December 2018, and Mackinlay was acquitted on 9 January 2019. Little was convicted of two counts relating to falsifying election expenses and was given a nine-month suspended prison sentence and fined £5,000; the court concluded that Mackinlay and Gray had signed documents falsified by Little "in good faith, not knowing what she had done".

Public service
Mackinlay was appointed as a Justice of the Peace on the North Kent Bench in 2006. A Freeman of the City of London, he serves as a trustee of three Kent charities: Chatham Historic Dockyard Trust, Foord Almshouses in Rochester, and Medway Sculpture Trust.

Electoral history
UK Parliament elections

Police and Crime Commissioner elections

Local elections

European Parliament elections

References

External links
The official Craig Mackinlay website

www.souththanetconservatives.org.uk

|-

|-

1966 births
Alumni of the University of Birmingham
Conservative Party (UK) MPs for English constituencies
Councillors in Kent
Living people
English people of Scottish descent
People educated at Rainham Mark Grammar School 
People from Rainham, Kent
UK Independence Party parliamentary candidates
UK MPs 2015–2017
UK MPs 2017–2019
UK MPs 2019–present
Conservative Party (UK) councillors
British Eurosceptics
Leaders of the UK Independence Party